Kenneth A. Plante (December 17, 1939 – March 1, 2015)  was an American politician in the state of Florida.

Plante was born in Orlando and attended the University of Florida. He was elected to the State Senate for the 16th district in 1966 and served until 1972. He was redistricted to the 14th district in 1973, and served until 1978. He is a member of the Republican party. In 2012, he was diagnosed with amyotrophic lateral sclerosis (ALS). He died of the disease in March 2015.

References

2015 deaths
1939 births
Republican Party Florida state senators